The siege of Saint-Pierre-le-Moûtier was a venture of the so-called Lancastrian War. The small town was however heavily fortified and surrounded by a deep moat. According to Joan of Arc's bodyguard, Jean d'Aulon, the initial assault failed and the retreat was sounded. Joan managed to initiate a second assault which, according to d'Aulon, was met 'without much resistance'. d'Aulon had been wounded in the heel during the initial assault and was therefore probably mounted on his horse during the second assault.

As the aim to take all enemy strongholds on the Loire banks was put forward, the besieging of Saint-Pierre-le-Moûtier was adopted. Joan and Charles d'Albret united the forces at Bourges and proceeded onwards to Saint-Pierre-le-Moutier. The defenders put up a vigorous defence. Nonetheless, the town was eventually taken by assault on 4 November 1429. When the town was captured, Charles VII bestowed on Joan noble status.  On August 24, 1902, a statue of Joan of Arc was unveiled in the city.

See also
Siege of La Charité

References

1429 in Europe
1420s in France
Sieges involving France
Armagnac–Burgundian Civil War
Conflicts in 1429
Nièvre
Sieges of the Hundred Years' War
Hundred Years' War, 1415–1453
Joan of Arc